Leukbach is a river of Saarland and Rhineland-Palatinate, Germany. It flows into the Saar in Saarburg.

See also

List of rivers of Rhineland-Palatinate
List of rivers of Saarland

Rivers of Saarland
Rivers of Rhineland-Palatinate
Rivers of Germany